This Is Nollywood is a 2007 Nigerian documentary film by Franco Sacchi and Robert Caputo, detailing the Nigerian film industry, much along the same lines as the acclaimed 2007 documentary Welcome to Nollywood by Jamie Meltzer

Through the story of director Bond Emeruwa, this documentary tells the story of a $250 million industry that has created thousands of jobs. As the documentary follows Emeruwa's production of Check Point, various members of the Nigerian filmmaking community discuss their industry, defend the types of films they make and the impact they have, and describe common difficulties they encounter, from hectic shooting schedules to losing electricity mid-shoot.

Synopsis 
This is Nollywood follows Nigerian director Bond Emeruwa on his quest to finish filming a feature-length action movie in nine days on the outskirts of Lagos. However, Bond is just one of the incredible protagonists of Nollywood, Nigeria’s burgeoning, but little known movie industry that is rapidly changing Africa's modern popular culture. In the end, the film is about more than a fascinating and unheralded movie industry, it is about how people surmount obstacles to achieve their dreams.

Awards 
 Festival Internacional de Abuja 2007

See also
Welcome to Nollywood
Nollywood Babylon
List of Nigerian films of 2006

References

External links

Film page on Newsreel.org
 

Documentary films about African cinema
2007 films
2007 documentary films
Nigerian documentary films
2000s English-language films